The Apostolic Prefecture of Azerbaijan is a Roman Catholic Apostolic Prefecture (missionary jurisdiction) in Baku, the capital of Azerbaijan. It is exempt, i.e. directly subject to the Holy See, not part of any ecclesiastical province. It has one church and four chapels situated in Baku, including its pro-cathedral the Church of the Immaculate Conception. Its legal status is ensured by the local law of the Azerbaijan Republic and is having a special status thanks to the Concordat signed by Pope John Paul II and former president Heydar Aliyev.

History 
It was established on 11 October 2000 as Mission sui iuris of Baku, on territory split from the Apostolic Administration of the Caucasus. In May 2002 it enjoyed a papal visit by John Paul II and in October 2016 by Pope Francis.  On 4 August 2011, it was promoted as Apostolic Prefecture of Azerbaijan. As of 2015, the estimated total population in the prefecture is 9,867,250 and 560 are members of the Catholic Church.

Coat of arms 
The proposal of coat of arms created by Marek Sobola, a heraldic artist from Slovakia in November 2017.

Incumbents 
So far, there are three Monastic Orders: Salesians of Don Bosco (S.D.B.), Missionaries of Charity (C.M) (also known as Sisters of Mother Teresa) and Salesian Sisters (F.M.A.). There is no diocesan priest and only seven of the Salesian community are Catholic priests.
 Friar Jozef Daniel Pravda, S.D.B. (11. 10. 2000 – 18. 7. 2003)
 Friar Ján Čapla, S.D.B. (18. 7. 2003 – 11. 05. 2009)
 Friar Vladimir Fekete, S.D.B.  (11. 05. 2009 – 04. 08. 2011)

 Apostolic Prefects of Azerbaijan
 Bishop Vladimir Fekete, S.D.B. (04. 08. 2011 – present; named a bishop, by Pope Francis, while remaining Apostolic Prefect of Azerbaijan, on 12. 08. 2017; consecrated on 11 February 2018)

See also
Roman Catholicism in Azerbaijan

Source and External links
 GigaCatholic, with incumbent biography links

References 

Christian organizations established in 2000
Apostolic prefectures
Catholic Church in Azerbaijan